The Chełmno Voivodeship was a unit of administrative division and local government in the Kingdom of Poland since 1454/1466 until the Partitions of Poland in 1772/1795. Together with the Pomeranian and Malbork Voivodeships and the Prince-Bishopric of Warmia it formed the historical province of Royal Prussia. Its capital was at Chełmno.

History

The Land of Chełmno (later known in German as Kulmerland) had been part of the Polish Duchy of Masovia since 1138. It was occupied by pagan Old Prussian tribes in 1216, who struggled against their Christianization instigated by Bishop Christian of Oliva. After several unsuccessful attempts to reconquer Chełmno, Duke Konrad I of Masovia in 1226 called for support by the Teutonic Knights, who indeed approached and started a Prussian campaign, after the duke promised them the unshared possession of the Chełmno territory as part of the Order's State.

In the course of the Order's decline after the 1410 Battle of Grunwald, the citizens of Chełmno, Toruń (Thorn) and Lubawa (Löbau) joined the uprising of the Prussian Confederation, which sparked the Thirteen Years' War between the Knights and the Kingdom of Poland. After the Order's defeat, the Chełmno Land fell back to Poland according to the Second Peace of Thorn and together with the adjacent Michelauer land in the east formed the Chełmno Voivodeship of the Polish Crown, since the 1569 Union of Lublin part of the Polish–Lithuanian Commonwealth.

The voivodeship was annexed by Prussia during the First Partition of Poland in 1772, except for the city of Toruń, which was not incorporated into the Province of West Prussia until the 1793 Second Partition.

Administration
Voivodeship Governor (Wojewoda) seat:
 Chełmno

Regional council (sejmik generalny)
 Grudziądz

Regional councils (sejmik poselski i deputacki)
 Kowalewo
 Radzyń

Administrative division:
 Chełmno Land, (Ziemia Chełmińska), Chełmno
 Chełmno County, (Powiat Chełmiński), Chełmno
 Toruń County, (Powiat Toruński), Toruń
 Grudziądz County, (Powiat Grudziądzki), Grudziądz
 Radzyń County, (Powiat Radzyński), Radzyń
 Kowalewo County, (Powiat Kowalewski), Kowalewo
 Michałowo Land, (Ziemia Michałowska), Lubawa
 Brodnica County, (Powiat Brodnicki), Brodnica
 Nowe Miasto County, (Powiat Nowomiejki), Nowe Miasto Lubawskie

Voivodes
 Augustyn z Szewy, 1454–1455
 Gabriel Bażyński, 1455–1474
 Ludwik Mortęski, 1475–1480
 Mikołaj Dąbrowski, 1480–1483
 Karol z Napola, 1484–1495
 Jan Dąbrowski, 1498–1513
 Jan Luzjański, 1514–1551
 Stanisław Kostka, 1551–1555
 Jan Działyński, 1556–1583
 Mikołaj Działyński, 1584–1604
 Maciej Konopacki, 1605–1611
 Ludwik Mortęski, 1611–1615
 Stanisław Działyński, 1615-1615
 Jan Jakub Wejher, 1618–1626
 Melchior Wejher, 1626–1643
 Mikołaj Wejher, 1643–1647
 Jan Działyński, 1647–1648
 Jan Kos, 1648–1662
 Piotr Działyński, 1663–1668
 Jan Gniński, 1668–1680
 Michał Działyński, 1681–1687
 Jan Kos (died 1702),1688–1702
 Tomasz Działyński, 1702–1714
 Jakub Zygmunt Rybiński, 1714–1725
 Franciszek Bieliński, 1725–1732
 Jan Ansgary Czapski 1732–1738
 Michał Wiktor Bieliński, 1738–1746
 Zygmunt Kretkowski, 1746–1766
 Franciszek Stanisław Hutten-Czapski, 1766–1802

References

Voivodeships of the Polish–Lithuanian Commonwealth
Royal Prussia
1466 establishments in Europe
15th-century establishments in Poland
1793 disestablishments in the Polish–Lithuanian Commonwealth